Stefano Scappini (born 2 February 1988) is an Italian footballer who plays as a forward for  club Torres.

Career

Ternana
Born in Perugia, Umbria, Scappini started his career at Umbrian side Ternana. He made his professional debut in February 2007 and made a total of 21 matches at Serie C1.

Sampdoria
On 28 January 2008, he left for Serie A side Sampdoria in a temporary deal. He scored a goal for Sampdoria Primavera Under-20 Team at Torneo di Viareggio 2008 on 2 February. In July 2008, Sampdoria decided to buy him in co-ownership deal for €150,000 and loaned back to Ternana of Lega Pro Prima Divisione (ex-Serie C1). In June 2009, Sampdoria bought him outright after won the auction between the two clubs, for €105,000.

Ravenna
In July 2009, he was sent to Prima Divisione side Ravenna in another co-ownership deal for €120,000. He scored 6 goals, (1 at 2009–10 Coppa Italia), became the second highest goalscorer of the team ahead Luca Gerbino Polo, behind Federico Piovaccari. He successively joined Alessandria for the new 2010–11 season.

On 18 September 2009, he was involved in the accident which resulted in the death of his teammate Brian Filipi: the two players were hit by a car while walking in a street in Cervia.

Return to Sampdoria
On 24 June 2011, Sampdoria bought back Scappini from Ravenna for €200,000 in a 4-year contract. He was transferred to Sorrento, Pisa, Grosseto and Castel Rigone in temporary deals during his entire Sampdoria career.

Savona
On 22 August 2014 he was signed by Savona F.B.C. for free in a 1-year contract.

Pontedera and Cremonese
In the 2015–2016 season playing for the Pontedera; in the summer of 2016 he moved to Cremonese.

Cittadella
On 9 July 2018, he joined Serie B club Cittadella.

Reggiana
On 25 July 2019, he signed with Reggiana. On 16 September 2020 he moved to Modena on loan.

Torres
On 22 September 2022, Scappini moved to Torres.

References

External links
 
 
 Profile at AIC.Football.it  

1988 births
Sportspeople from Perugia
Footballers from Umbria
Living people
Italian footballers
Association football forwards
Ternana Calcio players
U.C. Sampdoria players
Ravenna F.C. players
U.S. Alessandria Calcio 1912 players
A.S.D. Sorrento players
Pisa S.C. players
F.C. Grosseto S.S.D. players
Savona F.B.C. players
U.S. Città di Pontedera players
U.S. Cremonese players
A.S. Cittadella players
A.C. Reggiana 1919 players
Modena F.C. players
S.E.F. Torres 1903 players
Serie B players
Serie C players